Bilel Ifa (born 9 March 1990) is a Tunisian professional footballer who plays as a centre-back for Kuwaiti club Kuwait and the Tunisia national team.

Career
Born in Aryanah, Ifa has played club football for Club Africain.

On 12 January 2022, Ifa joined Saudi Arabian club Abha.

On 1 September 2022, Ifa joined Kuwait on a one-year deal.

He made his international debut for Tunisia in 2008.

References

1990 births
Living people
People from Aryanah
Tunisian footballers
Tunisian expatriate footballers
Association football central defenders
Tunisia international footballers
2010 Africa Cup of Nations players
2012 Africa Cup of Nations players
2013 Africa Cup of Nations players
Club Africain players
Abha Club players
Kuwait SC players
Tunisian Ligue Professionnelle 1 players
Saudi Professional League players
Kuwait Premier League players
Expatriate footballers in Saudi Arabia
Tunisian expatriate sportspeople in Saudi Arabia
Expatriate footballers in Kuwait
Tunisian expatriate sportspeople in Kuwait
2021 Africa Cup of Nations players
2022 FIFA World Cup players